The University of the Philippines Madrigal Singers (UPMS), also known as the Philippine Madrigal Singers or simply Madz, is one of the major choral groups based in the University of the Philippines, Diliman.  Its current conductor, musical director and a choirmaster is Mark Anthony Carpio. They are the first choir in the world to win the European Grand Prix for Choral Singing twice (in 1997 and in 2007). To date, only four choirs in the world have attained this achievement.

History 

The Philippine Madrigal Singers (affectionately known as the "Madz") was founded in 1963 by National Artist for Music, Professor Andrea O. Veneracion. The Madz is mostly composed of students, faculty and alumni from the University of the Philippines.

The group performs in a variety of styles and forms but it specializes in the Madrigal, a polyphonic and challenging musical style popular during the Renaissance period where singers and guests would gather around the table during a banquet to sight-sing and make music together. This served as the inspiration for their unique style of singing - singing seated in a semicircle without a conductor. As Philippine ambassador of culture and goodwill, the Madz has given command performances for royalty and heads of state.  These include Pope Paul VI, Pope John Paul II, United States Presidents Gerald Ford, Richard Nixon, and Barack Obama, Chinese President Hu Jintao, Queen Sofia of Spain, King Juan Carlos I of Spain, and Prime Minister Lee Kuan Yew.

As resident artists of the Cultural Center of the Philippines, the group has performed in outreach concerts in far-flung areas seldom reached by most performing artists. 

The group is presently under the leadership of Madz alumnus Mark Anthony A. Carpio.

Awards

In June 1997, the Philippine Madrigal Singers came home from their ninth world concert tour, winning the grand prize in the Grand Prix European de Chant Choral Competition in Tours, France, besting five other grand prize winners of the most prestigious choral competition in Europe: Guido d'Arezzo, Italy; Debrecen, Hungary; Varna, Bulgaria; Gorizia, Italy; and Tolosa, Spain. The Madz displayed a virtuoso performance so moving one juror had to describe the group's music as the "most beautiful sound on earth".

On August 26, 2007, the Philippine Madrigal Singers won, for the second time, the grand prize in the European Grand Prix for Choral Singing in Arezzo, Italy. This victory makes them the first of the only four choirs in the world to win the grand prize twice. The European Grand Prix is widely understood to be the Olympics of the choral circuit.

On July 27, 2009, UNESCO honored the Madz and designated the group as UNESCO Artist for Peace. This title is given to celebrity advocates charged with the mission of embodying and raising awareness in the UNESCO ideals, which include peace, security, fundamental human rights and freedom.

On September 19, 2010, the Philippine Madrigal Singers was conferred the Guidoneum Award 2010 by the Fondazione Guido d’Arezzo in Italy. Foundation President Francesco Lusi, said during the awarding that the foundation "followed attentively and with great pleasure the fruitful activities of the Madrigal Singers and are grateful for all that the Philippine Madrigal Singers have done for the choral world”. He further stressed that "the foundation honored the Madrigal Singers “for the artistic and choral promotion activity that they carried out after they won the European Grand Prix for Choral Singing in 2007.”

On August 27, 2016, the Philippine Madrigal Singers won the Grand Prix at the 64th International Choral Competition in Arezzo, Italy. Their win qualifies them for the European Grand Prix to be held in Tolosa, Spain in 2017.

Recent Milestones
26 August 2007: The Phlippine Madrigal singers becomes the first choir in the world to win the European Grand Prix for Choral Singing twice.
 3 August 2011: The Philippine Madrigal Singers made a debut at the Teatro Colón in Buenos Aires. They are the first Filipino choir to sing in Argentina.
1 July 2012: The Philippine Madrigal Singers becomes the first choir in the world to receive the Brand Laureate Premier Award (as World’s Best Choral Ensemble) from the Asia Pacific Brands Foundation.
 7 September 2013: The Madrigal Singers held a joint concert with the Swingle Singers, a 5-time Grammy Award winning vocal group, at the Cultural Center of the Philippines.
 January 2015 : The Madrigal Singers led thousands of singers in the celebrations during the Pastoral and State visit of Pope Francis
 9 May 2015: The Madrigal Singers held a joint concert with the King's Singers at the Cultural Center of the Philippines .

Performances
The Philippine Madrigal singers had performed various arrangements from some Choral Arrangers/Composers like Josu Elberdin (Particularly Psalm 96, Cantate Domino). They also sang arrangements from Filipino Composers including Robert Delgado ( Allen Pote-Prayer of St. francis), Anna Abeleda-Piquero (Circle of Life- Lion King OST), Nilo Alcala (Dayo Dayo Kupita at the Florilege Vocal de Tours in France, and Kaisa-isa Niyan, which was  part of their winning repertoire at the 2007 European Grand Prix for Choral Singing in Arezzo, Italy). Some of their members like Saunder Choi (Tenor 2) and Ily Matthew Maniano (Contratenor altus) also arrange and compose songs for the group.

Discography
 Joy: A Choral Celebration of Christmas (1997)
 Bayan Ko, Aawitan Kita (1998)
 Madz in Love (1999)
 Madz Around the World (2000)
 Acclamation (2006)
 Love, Joy and Inspiration (2006) - a special edition compilation containing the CDs Joy, Madz in Love and Acclamation
 Maior Caritas Op. 5 (2008)
 Madz in Love Continues... (2009)
 Madz Goes Jesuit (Songs from the Concert) (2015)
ONOMATOPOEIA: The Choral Works of NILO ALCALA (2017)

Choirmasters
 Founding Choirmaster - Andrea Veneracion (1963–2001, retired, deceased)
 Current Choirmaster - Mark Anthony Carpio (2001–present)

References

Filipino choirs
Philippines Madrigal Singers
Musical groups from Metro Manila
Musical groups established in 1963